The 2007 edition of the Men's Under-23 Time Trial World Championships took place on September 26. The Championships were hosted by the German city of Stuttgart, and featured two laps of an urban circuit, amounting to 38.1 kilometres of racing against the clock. Dutch rider Lars Boom won the gold medal as the 2007 Men's Under-23 World Time Trial Champion.

Men's Under-23 general standings

2007-09-26: Stuttgart, 38.1 km (ITT)

External links
Results
Race website

Men's Under-23 Time Trial
UCI Road World Championships – Men's under-23 time trial